Liz Carmouche (born February 19, 1984) is an American mixed martial arts fighter currently signed to Bellator MMA, where she is the current Bellator Women's Flyweight World Champion. Carmouche competed for the Ultimate Fighting Championship (UFC) in the Women's Flyweight and Women's Bantamweight divisions. At the time of her UFC departure, she was #4 in the UFC women's flyweight rankings.

Carmouche competed in the first ever women's MMA match in the UFC when she competed against Ronda Rousey for the UFC Women's Bantamweight Championship at UFC 157. A two-time title challenger, Carmouche also challenged for the UFC Women's Flyweight Championship in August 2019 against Valentina Shevchenko. Carmouche was the first openly lesbian fighter in the UFC and was praised by company president Dana White for coming out. As of April 26, 2022, she is #2 in the Bellator Women's pound-for-pound Rankings.

Early life and military service

Carmouche was born in Lafayette, Louisiana, and grew up on Okinawa, Japan. She is of Lebanese, Irish and Cajun French descent. She currently resides in San Diego, California, and trains at San Diego Combat Academy.

She went to Okinawa Christian School International in Japan graduating in the class of 2003. She is currently attending San Diego City College studying Kinesiology.

Prior to becoming a professional MMA fighter, Carmouche spent five years in the Marine Corps as an aviation electrician during which she did three tours of duty in the Middle East. Her nickname is Girl-Rilla, earned from her muscular physique and strength that outperforms male counterparts.

Mixed martial arts career

Early career
Carmouche started her professional career in 2010, winning her first three fights via knockout or submission.

Strikeforce
On August 13, 2010, she made her Strikeforce debut at Strikeforce Challengers 10 in a reserve bout for their one-night Women's Welterweight tournament. She defeated Colleen Schneider via unanimous decision after two rounds.

Carmouche returned to the promotion at Strikeforce Challengers 12 on November 19, 2010, where she defeated Jan Finney via TKO in the third round.

On February 23, 2011, it was announced that number one title contender Miesha Tate had suffered a knee injury and that Carmouche would step in on short notice to face Women's Bantamweight (135 lbs) champion Marloes Coenen on March 5, 2011, at Strikeforce: Feijao vs. Henderson. Carmouche was defeated via triangle choke in the fourth round, after dominating two of the previous rounds.

On July 22, 2011, Carmouche faced Sarah Kaufman at Strikeforce Challengers: Voelker vs. Bowling III in Las Vegas, Nevada. She was defeated by unanimous decision.

Carmouche was scheduled to return to Strikeforce to face Sara McMann at Strikeforce: Cormier vs. Mir on November 3, 2012, but the event was cancelled.

Invicta Fighting Championships
Carmouche faced Ashleigh Curry at Invicta Fighting Championships 1 on April 28, 2012. She won the fight via TKO in the first round.

Carmouche faced Kaitlin Young at Invicta Fighting Championships 2 on July 28, 2012. She won the fight via submission due to a rear-naked choke in the second round.

Ultimate Fighting Championship
It was announced at the UFC on Fox: Henderson vs. Diaz pre-fight press conference by UFC President Dana White that former Strikeforce Women's Bantamweight Champion Ronda Rousey would be the very first UFC Women's Bantamweight Champion. It was confirmed by White that Carmouche would be challenging Rousey for the Women's Bantamweight title at UFC 157. In the early part of the first round, Carmouche locked in a standing rear-naked choke/face crank on Rousey. However, Rousey escaped and eventually finished the fight by armbar with 11 seconds left in the first round.

Carmouche was expected to face Miesha Tate at UFC on Fox 8 on July 27, 2013. However, Tate was pulled from the bout to participate as a coach on The Ultimate Fighter 18. Carmouche instead faced promotional newcomer Jéssica Andrade. She won the fight by TKO in round two, earning her first win inside the Octagon.

In her third UFC fight, Carmouche faced Alexis Davis on November 6, 2013, at UFC Fight Night 31. She lost the fight via unanimous decision.

Carmouche faced Miesha Tate in the co-main event at UFC on Fox 11. She lost the back-and-forth fight via unanimous decision.

Carmouche faced Lauren Murphy on April 4, 2015, at UFC Fight Night 63. She won the fight by unanimous decision. However, 10 out of 13 media outlets scored the bout for Murphy, whilst 3 scored it for Carmouche.

Carmouche faced Katlyn Chookagian on November 12, 2016, at UFC 205. She won the fight via split decision.

Flyweight division
Carmouche faced Alexis Davis in a women's flyweight bout on December 9, 2017, at UFC Fight Night 123. She lost the fight by split decision.

Carmouche faced Jennifer Maia on July 14, 2018, at UFC Fight Night 133. She won the fight by unanimous decision.

Carmouche faced Lucie Pudilová on February 23, 2019, at UFC Fight Night 145. She won the fight by unanimous decision.

A rematch with Valentina Shevchenko was scheduled on August 10, 2019, at UFC Fight Night 156 for the UFC Women's Flyweight Championship. She lost the fight via unanimous decision.

On December 6, 2019, it was announced that Carmouche had been released from the UFC despite signing a new contract after the failed title bid.

Bellator MMA 
On December 21, 2019, Carmouche was signed by Bellator MMA.

Carmouche was scheduled to make her debut at Bellator against Mandy Böhm on May 29, 2020, at Bellator 243 but the bout was cancelled due to the COVID-19 pandemic. Carmouche made her promotional debut against DeAnna Bennett at Bellator 246 on September 12, 2020. At the weigh-ins, Bennett missed weight, weighing in at 131.7 pounds. The bout proceeded as a catchweight and Carmouche was awarded a percentage of Bennett's purse. Carmouche won the bout via third round submission.

Carmouche faced former Invicta FC Flyweight World Champion Vanessa Porto on April 9, 2021, at Bellator 256. She won the bout via a unanimous decision.

Carmouche faced Kana Watanabe on June 25, 2021, at Bellator 261. She won the bout via TKO within 35 seconds of the first round.

Bellator Women's Flyweight World Champion
Carmouche faced undefeated flyweight champ, Juliana Velasquez for the Bellator Women's Flyweight World Championship on April 22, 2022, at Bellator 278. She won the bout and the title via elbows from crucifix at the end of the fourth round. Following the bout, Velasquez's team appealed the result on the grounds of refereeing error made by Mike Beltran, but the appeal was denied by the Hawaii State Boxing Commission.

In a title rematch, Carmouche faced Juliana Velasquez again on December 9, 2022, at Bellator 289. She won the fight via an armbar submission in the second round.

Carmouche is scheduled to defend her title in a rematch against DeAnna Bennett on April 21, 2023, at Bellator 294.

Championships and accomplishments
Bellator MMA
Bellator Women's Flyweight World Championship (One time, current)
One successful title defense
2010 – WMMA Press Awards Newcomer of the Year

Personal life
Carmouche is openly lesbian, and has a son with her wife. She has a tattoo on her left side representing the Chinese zodiac symbol of her mother and sister. Carmouche is the spokesperson for Medical Marijuana Inc. on the cannabidiol (CBD) therapeutic benefits for athletes.

Mixed martial arts record

|-
|Win
|align=center|18–7
|Juliana Velasquez
|Submission (armbar)
|Bellator 289
|
|align=center|2
|align=center|4:24
|Uncasville, Connecticut, United States
|
|-
|Win
|align=center|17–7
|Juliana Velasquez
|TKO (elbows)
|Bellator 278
|
|align=center|4
|align=center|4:47
|Honolulu, Hawaii, United States
|
|-
|Win
|align=center|16–7
|Kana Watanabe
|TKO (punches)
|Bellator 261 
|
|align=center|1
|align=center|0:35
|Uncasville, Connecticut, United States 
|
|-
|Win
|align=center|15–7
|Vanessa Porto
|Decision (unanimous)
|Bellator 256 
|
|align=center|3
|align=center|5:00
|Uncasville, Connecticut, United States 
|
|-
|Win
|align=center|14–7
|DeAnna Bennett
|Submission (rear-naked choke)
|Bellator 246
|
|align=center|3
|align=center|3:17
|Uncasville, Connecticut, United States
|
|-
|Loss
|align=center|13–7
|Valentina Shevchenko
|Decision (unanimous)
|UFC Fight Night: Shevchenko vs. Carmouche 2 
|
|align=center|5
|align=center|5:00
|Montevideo, Uruguay
|
|-
|Win
|align=center|13–6
|Lucie Pudilová
|Decision (unanimous)
|UFC Fight Night: Błachowicz vs. Santos 
|
|align=center|3
|align=center|5:00
|Prague, Czech Republic
|
|-
|Win
|align=center|12–6
|Jennifer Maia
|Decision (unanimous)
|UFC Fight Night: dos Santos vs. Ivanov 
|
|align=center|3
|align=center|5:00
|Boise, Idaho, United States
|
|-
|Loss
|align=center|11–6
|Alexis Davis
|Decision (split)
|UFC Fight Night: Swanson vs. Ortega
|
|align=center|3
|align=center|5:00
|Fresno, California, United States
|
|-
|Win
|align=center|11–5
|Katlyn Chookagian
|Decision (split)
|UFC 205
|
|align=center|3
|align=center|5:00
|New York City, New York, United States
|
|-
| Win
| align=center| 10–5
| Lauren Murphy
| Decision (unanimous)
| UFC Fight Night: Mendes vs. Lamas
| 
| align=center| 3
| align=center| 5:00
| Fairfax, Virginia, United States
| 
|-
| Loss
| align=center| 9–5
| Miesha Tate
| Decision (unanimous)
| UFC on Fox: Werdum vs. Browne
| 
| align=center| 3
| align=center| 5:00
| Orlando, Florida, United States
| 
|-
| Loss
| align=center| 9–4
| Alexis Davis
| Decision (unanimous)
| UFC: Fight for the Troops 3
| 
| align=center| 3
| align=center| 5:00
| Fort Campbell, Kentucky, United States
| 
|-
| Win
| align=center| 9–3
| Jéssica Andrade
| TKO (punches and elbows)
| UFC on Fox: Johnson vs. Moraga
| 
| align=center| 2
| align=center| 3:57
| Seattle, Washington, United States
| 
|-
| Loss
| align=center| 8–3
| Ronda Rousey
| Submission (armbar)
| UFC 157
| 
| align=center| 1
| align=center| 4:49
| Anaheim, California, United States
| 
|-
| Win
| align=center| 8–2
| Kaitlin Young
| Submission (rear-naked choke)
| Invicta FC 2: Baszler vs. McMann
| 
| align=center| 2
| align=center| 3:34
| Kansas City, Kansas, United States
| 
|-
| Win
| align=center| 7–2
| Ashleigh Curry
| TKO (punches)
| Invicta FC 1: Coenen vs. Ruyssen
| 
| align=center| 1
| align=center| 1:58
| Kansas City, Kansas, United States
| 
|-
| Loss
| align=center| 6–2
| Sarah Kaufman
| Decision (unanimous)
| Strikeforce Challengers: Voelker vs. Bowling III
| 
| align=center| 3
| align=center| 5:00
| Las Vegas, Nevada, United States
| 
|-
| Loss
| align=center| 6–1
| Marloes Coenen
| Submission (triangle choke)
| Strikeforce: Feijao vs. Henderson
| 
| align=center| 4
| align=center| 1:29
| Columbus, Ohio, United States
| 
|-
| Win
| align=center| 6–0
| Jan Finney
| TKO (punches)
| Strikeforce Challengers: Wilcox vs. Ribeiro
| 
| align=center| 3
| align=center| 1:30
| Jackson, Mississippi, United States
| 
|-
| Win
| align=center| 5–0
| Valentina Shevchenko
| TKO (doctor stoppage)
| C3 Fights: Red River Rivalry
| 
| align=center| 2
| align=center| 3:00
| Concho, Oklahoma, United States
| 
|-
| Win
| align=center| 4–0
| Colleen Schneider
| Decision (unanimous)
| Strikeforce Challengers: Riggs vs. Taylor
| 
| align=center| 2
| align=center| 3:00
| Phoenix, Arizona, United States
| 
|-
| Win
| align=center| 3–0
| Margarita de la Cruz Ramirez
| TKO (doctor stoppage)
| Ultimate Warrior Challenge 7
| 
| align=center| 2
| align=center| 5:00
| Tijuana, Mexico
| 
|-
| Win
| align=center| 2–0
| Aleena Albertson
| Submission (armbar)
| Native Fighting Championship 5
| 
| align=center| 2
| align=center| 0:48
| Campo, California, United States
| 
|-
| Win
| align=center| 1–0
| Trudie Ginn
| TKO (body kick)
| Independent Event
| 
| align=center| 1
| align=center| 2:59
| Tijuana, Mexico
| 
|-

See also
 List of current Bellator fighters 
 List of female mixed martial artists

References

External links
 
 

Living people
1984 births
Bantamweight mixed martial artists
Mixed martial artists utilizing American Kenpo
Mixed martial artists utilizing Brazilian jiu-jitsu
American LGBT military personnel
United States Marine Corps personnel of the Iraq War
American female mixed martial artists
American people of Irish descent
American people of Lebanese descent
American expatriate sportspeople in Japan
Cajun sportspeople
American female karateka
Lesbian sportswomen
LGBT mixed martial artists
LGBT people from Louisiana
American LGBT sportspeople
Mixed martial artists from California
Female United States Marine Corps personnel
Women in the Iraq War
American practitioners of Brazilian jiu-jitsu
Lesbian military personnel
Ultimate Fighting Championship female fighters
LGBT Brazilian jiu-jitsu practitioners
LGBT karateka
21st-century American women
Sportspeople of Lebanese descent